Athletics at the 2015 Pacific Games was held in Port Moresby, Papua New Guinea on July 13–18, 2015. Four parasport events were also included.

Participating nations
Twenty countries competed at the 2015 Pacific Games in athletics:

Note: The number of athletes registered for the 2015 Pacific Games to represent each country is shown in brackets.

Medal summary

Medal table

Men's results

Women's results

See also
 Athletics at the Pacific Games

References

External links
Full results

2015 Pacific Games
Athletics at the Pacific Games
Pacific Games